BDWM Transport was a transport company in Switzerland, that operated regional rail and bus services in the cantons of Aargau and Zürich. The company merged with Wynental and Suhrental Railway to form Aargau Verkehr AG (AVA).

The company operates:
 The Bremgarten–Dietikon railway line (line S17 of the Zürich S-Bahn)
 The Wohlen–Meisterschwanden bus service
 The SBB bus Zofingen / Reiden
 The express bus Bremgarten / Busslingen–Zurich Enge
 The Limmat Bus AG

In May 2016 it was announced that the Limmattal light rail line, to be constructed in the densely populated Limmattal area to the west of Zürich, would be operated by BDWM. The line will connect Killwangen, Spreitenbach, Dietikon, Urdorf and Schlieren to Zürich-Altstetten railway station, with connection to the Bremgarten–Dietikon line at Dietikon and to Zürich tram route 2 at Farbhof. Construction is scheduled to start in late 2017, with a planned opening in 2022.

References

External links
 
 Company web site

Aargau Verkehr predecessors
Bus companies of Switzerland
Defunct railway companies of Switzerland
Public transport in Switzerland
Swiss companies disestablished in 2018
Swiss companies established in 2000
Transport companies disestablished in 2018
Transport companies established in 2000
Transport in Aargau
Transport in the canton of Zürich